Havelland culture was a neolithic archaeological culture in northeastern Germany, centered at Havelland, with contacts to the Globular Amphora culture. It was characterized by cups with handles, amphoras with to handles, and barrels and dishes with carpet-like decorations. The dead were buried unburned. The Havelland people were farmers and breeders.

Literature
E.Probst: Deutschland in der Steinzeit, München 1991, 386 - 388.
H.Behrens: Die Jungsteinzeit im Mittelelbe-Saale-Gebiet, Berlin 1973, 114 - 116.
G.Wetzel: Jungsteinzeit, In: Potsdam, Brandenburg und das Havelland (Führer zu archäologischen Denkmälern in Deutschland 37), 39 - 52 und 145 - 152. 

Archaeological cultures of Central Europe
Archaeological cultures in Germany
Neolithic cultures of Europe
History of Brandenburg
History of Pomerania